Nina Ivanovna Ruslanova  (5 December 1945 – 21 November 2021) was a Soviet and Russian theater and film actress. She was honored as a People's Artist of Russia (1998).

Early life
Ruslanova was orphaned at two months old in late winter 1945 in Bohodukhiv. Her surname (after Lidia Ruslanova) comes from the orphanages in the Kharkiv Oblast. She lived in five children's homes. She graduated from college with a degree as a construction plasterer. She then entered the Kharkiv Theatre Institute, where she studied for one term.

She moved to Moscow in 1969 and graduated Boris Shchukin Theatre Institute. Thereafter Ruslanova worked in Vakhtangov Theater, and from 1985 to 1988 in Mayakovsky Theatre. She debuted in movies in 1967. Her first role was Nadezhda in Kira Muratova's film Brief Encounters.

Death
Ruslanova died from a long illness complicated by COVID-19 and pneumonia on 21 November 2021, during the COVID-19 pandemic in Russia. She was 75.

Selected filmography 
 1967 — Brief Encounters as Nadezhda, housekeeper 
 1975 — Afonya (Афоня) as Tamara
 1980 — Do Not Shoot at White Swans (Не стреляйте в белых лебедей) as Haritina Makarovna
 1982 — Tears Were Falling (Слёзы капали) as Dina, girlfriend Vasin's
 1982 — Find and Neutralize (Найти и обезвредить) as Nyura
 1982 — The Train Has Stopped (Остановился поезд) as Maria Ignatyevna, party secretary
 1982 — Be My Husband (Будьте моим мужем) as Albina Petrovna
 1983 — Among Grey Stones (Среди серых камней) as housekeeper
 1983 — Twice Born (Дважды рождённый)
 1984 — My Friend Ivan Lapshin (Мой друг Иван Лапшин) as Natasha Adashova
 1985 — Do Not Marry, Girls (Не ходите, девки, замуж) as Anisa Ilinichna
 1986 — Kin-dza-dza! (Кин-дза-дза) as Galina Borisovna
 1987 — Tomorrow Was the War (Завтра была война) as Comrade Polyakova
 1987 — She with a Broom, He in a Black Hat (Она с метлой, он в чёрной шляпе) as Vasilisa
 1988 — Heart of a Dog (Собачье сердце) as Darya Petrovna Ivanova
 1991 — Promised Heaven (Небеса обетованные) as Jeanne's aunt, dressmaker from Tver
 1991 — Afghan Breakdown (Афганский излом) as Tatyana
 1992 — Trifles of Life (Мелочи жизни) as Natalia Yevdokimovna
 1997 — Poor Sasha (Бедная Саша) as Beryozkin's ex-wife
 1998 — The Circus Burned Down, and the Clowns Have Gone (Цирк сгорел, и клоуны разбежались) as Toma
 1998 — Mama Don't Cry (Мама, не горюй) as Tanya's mother
 1998 — Khrustalyov, My Car! (Хрусталёв, машину!) as wife of General
 2002 — Chekhov's Motifs (Чеховские мотивы) as woman
 2004 — The Tuner (Настройщик) as Lyuba
 2004 — My Fair Nanny (Моя прекрасная няня) as aunt Faya
 2006 — My Love (voice)
 2007 — The Irony of Fate 2 (Ирония Судьбы. Продолжение) as neighbor
 2010 — What Men Talk About (О чём говорят мужчины) as hotel administrator
 2011 — Once Upon a Time There Lived a Simple Woman (Жила-была одна баба) as Kryachiha
 2014 — Viy (Вий) as wife Yavtukh's

References

External links
 
 Nina Ruslanova bio at Lifeactor.ru 

1945 births
2021 deaths
Deaths from the COVID-19 pandemic in Russia
Soviet actresses
Russian actresses
Honored Artists of the RSFSR
People's Artists of Russia
Recipients of the Vasilyev Brothers State Prize of the RSFSR
Recipients of the Nika Award
Russian television actresses
20th-century Russian actresses
21st-century Russian actresses
Russian people of Ukrainian descent
People from Bohodukhiv